The Big Noise is a 2012 Australian film by Sydney-based director Dominic Pelosi and was written by Andrew Pelosi. The film was shot in and around Sydney's inner west and mainly features a cast of non professional actors. It was released in the United States in September 2012 and won multiple awards for direction, writing and acting.

External links
 

2012 films
Australian black comedy films
2010s English-language films
2010s Australian films